Frenchtown is a primarily African American neighborhood in Tallahassee, Florida. It is the oldest such neighborhood in the state.

Origin
Frenchtown originated from 19th century settlers who moved to the area from France. Their relocation was prompted by the July 4, 1825, Lafayette Land Grant which gave Gilbert du Motier, Marquis de Lafayette a township in the U.S. of his choice. Many of his acquaintances came over and began to carry on with their lives.

History

The Frenchtown area was home to those French settlers that did not move west to New Orleans or back to France. After the Civil War, newly freed African-Americans moved to the Frenchtown section; it occupied low-lying, relatively undesirable land, and therefore was available. From the early 20th century this area became a hub of activity with growing businesses. From 1940—1945, Ray Charles lived in this community. Nat Adderley and brother Cannonball Adderley were known to have played here in their younger days. The Red Bird Club and Cafe DeLuxe in Frenchtown provided a wealth of musical talent, with "Lawyer Smith and his Band" having been there for 30 years. The 1960s were a period of decline for Frenchtown, with increases in crime and the area around Alabama Street being designated a "Drug Corridor" by the U.S. Attorney's Office.

In April 2005, the Frenchtown Renaissance Center was completed and revitalization started. Frenchtown is also the home of the B Sharps Jazz Club (2008–), located at 648 West Brevard St. in the restored Woman's Working Band House of 1921; international jazz talent often perform there. The house is listed on the National Register of Historic Places.

Location
Frenchtown is located northwest of downtown Tallahassee. The City of Tallahassee Planning Department defined the neighborhood's boundaries as Seventh Avenue and Alabama Street to the north, Bronough Street to the east, Tennessee Street to the south and Woodward Avenue to the west. However, until the 1970s it extended south of Tennessee Street to Park Avenue, including land currently occupied by the LeRoy Collins Leon County Public Library.

In the 1990s, Frenchtown's main street, Macomb Street, was widened to four lanes. The buildings on the west side of the street, including some music venues, were torn down.

Education
Residents are served by Leon County Schools. Most residents are zoned to either Riley Elementary School or Bond Elementary School, while some are zoned to Ruediger Elementary School. Residents are divided between Griffin Middle School and Raa Middle School, and between Leon High School and Godby High School.

At the north end of Macomb Street is the Old Lincoln High School, today a neighborhood service center. It closed as a school in 1967, when blacks were admitted to the previously all-white Leon High School.

See also
 History of Tallahassee#Black history

Further reading
 Julianne Hare, Historic Frenchtown. Heart and Heritage in Tallahassee, Columbia, S.C., History Press, 2006, .

Sources

History of Tallahassee, Florida
Historic districts in Florida
Neighborhoods in Tallahassee, Florida
African-American history of Florida